The 1879 Louisiana gubernatorial election was the first election to take place under the Louisiana Constitution of 1879. As a result of this election Louis A. Wiltz became Governor of Louisiana. The election saw widespread intimidation of African-Americans which guaranteed the election of the Democratic nominee.

Results
Popular Vote

References

1879
Gubernatorial
Louisiana
December 1879 events